Darius Jaloyd Rush (born February 22, 2000) is an American football cornerback for the South Carolina Gamecocks.

Early life and high school
Rush grew up in Kingstree, South Carolina and attended C.E. Murray High School, where he played wide receiver and defensive back on the football team. As a senior, he caught 47 passes for 863 yards and 17 touchdowns and rushed for 125 yards and one touchdown. Rush committed to play college football at South Carolina over offers from Charlotte and Miami-Ohio.

College career
Rush redshirted his true freshman season at South Carolina. He played mostly special teams during his redshirt freshman season while he also moved from wide receiver to cornerback. Rush became a starter entering his junior season and finished the year with 25 tackles, eight passes broken up, and one interception. He had 38 tackles with seven passes broken up, two interceptions and one forced fumble as a redshirt senior. Following the end of the season Rush entered the 2023 NFL Draft.

References

External links
South Carolina Gamecocks bio

Living people
Players of American football from South Carolina
American football cornerbacks
South Carolina Gamecocks football players
2000 births